Clavus quadratus is a species of sea snail, a marine gastropod mollusk in the family Drilliidae.

Description
The spire of the claviform, light brown shell is rather low, its protoconch large and rather blunt. The whorls are rather convex, lacking an angle or shoulder. The shell is sculptured overall by raised spiral threads. The body whorl is rather quadrate. The aperture is oblong. The wide siphonal canal is rather short. The columella is straight. The anal sinus is deep and wide.

Distribution
This marine species occurs off East Transkei, South Africa

References

Endemic fauna of South Africa
quadratus
Gastropods described in 1988